Frank McKenna was a Major League Baseball shortstop who played in one game for the Philadelphia White Stockings in 1874.

McKenna had no hits in four at bats in his only career game.

External links

Philadelphia White Stockings players
Major League Baseball shortstops
19th-century baseball players